Ravi Arvind Palat (born  1954) is Professor at the Department of Sociology, Binghamton University, The State University of New York. He has undertaken research in historical sociology, political economy, nationalism and ethnic conflict, social theory. The common theme in his work is "excavating the Eurocentric biases of social theory".

He is the author of Capitalist Restructuring and the Pacific Rim (Routledge, London, 2004).; and The Making of an Indian Ocean World-Economy: Princes, Paddy fields, and Bazaars (Palgrave, New York, 2015).

Membership of Editorial Boards of Peer Reviewed Academic Journals
 Review, Fernand Braudel Center, Binghamton University, 2002-2020 
 Critical Asian Studies, 2002-.
 Development and Society

References

External links
 
 https://web.archive.org/web/20090806000652/http://fbc.binghamton.edu/structur.htm

1950s births
Living people
American sociologists
American social sciences writers
Geopoliticians
World system scholars
American international relations scholars
University of Madras alumni
Jawaharlal Nehru University alumni
Binghamton University faculty